Guifeng Mountain, Guifeng Shan, or Mount Guifeng (simplified Chinese: 圭峰山) is a mountain in the south-western part of Pearl River Delta in the city of Xinhui, Jiangmen. Covering a total area of 55.1 square kilometer, with an elevation of 545 meters above sea level, is a national 4A level tourist area. Guifeng Mountain is a well-known scenic area in Guangdong province.

Scenery 
Guifeng Mountain currently has 8 developed sightseeing area, with 1 flower park still under construction. Sightseeing areas include but not limited to: YuHu ChunXiao Garden, Yutai Bell Pavilion, Taoyuan Greenland, Longtan Waterfall, Shanding Scenic Area, Qianxian Guomai Lake, Tianehu Lake, and Chuilui Park.

References 

Mountains of Guangdong
Tourist attractions in Guangdong
Xinhui District